The Vasyugan is a river in the southern West Siberian Plain of Russia. It is a tributary of the Ob on the left side, and its course from its source in the Vasyugan Swamp is entirely within the Kargasok district of Tomsk Oblast.

Statistics 
Average annual runoff: 345 m³ / c, 10.9 km³ / year.

Tributaries:
 Right hand: Yelizarovka, Petryak, Yershovka, Kalganak, Pyonorovka, Nyurolka, Zimnyaya, Chizhapka, Pasil, Silga, Naushka, Kochebilovka, Lozunga.
 Left hand: Bolshoy Petryak, Listvenka, Korovya, Staritsa, Garchak, Kyn, Glukhaya, Chertala, Yagylyakh, Yegolyakh, Olenyovka, Kelvat, Lontynyakh, Katylga, Cheremshanka, Prudovaya, Makhnya, Martynovka, Varingyogan, Yokhomyakh, Chebachya, Kacharma, Malaya Kuletka.

Municipalities (downstream from source): Novy Vasyugan, Aypolovo, Novy Tevriz, Sredny Vasyugan, Staraya Beryozovka, Ust-Chizhapka, Naunak, Bolshaya Griva, Staroyugino, Novoyugino, Bondarka.

See also

References

Literature
 Evseeva NS Geography of Tomsk region. (Natural conditions and resources). - Tomsk: TSU, 2001, 223 pp.

Rivers of Tomsk Oblast